USS Cape Johnson has been the name of two ships in the service of the United States Navy.

, was a troop transport used during World War II.
USNS Cape Johnson, is a reserve vessel in the service of the Military Sealift Command.

United States Navy ship names